Richard Pickersgill (18 April 1749 in West Tanfield, North Riding of Yorkshire, England – July 1779 in London) was an English naval officer who accompanied the sailor and explorer James Cook on two of his Pacific voyages.

Richard Pickersgill was born in 1749 in West Tanfield, near Ripon, to Richard and Ann Pickersgill (née Lee). Pickersgill was the nephew of John Lee, the servant of George Jackson, a senior officer in the Admiralty. It is believed that his uncle managed to position him through his relationships on his first ships.

In 1766, at the age of 17, he participated in the circumnavigation of the world under Captain Samuel Wallis on HMS Dolphin. Two years later, on August 26, 1768, Pickersgill belonged as a Master's mate on HMS Endeavour, which set off with James Cook to its first South Sea voyage. On this trip he also impressed Cook, who had a high opinion of his skills as a surveyor, his dealings with the indigenous peoples they encountered, and his judgment. When Robert Molineux, the Master of the Endeavour, died on the return journey to England, Pickersgill was promoted to Master on April 16, 1771. After his return to London Pickersgill was promoted on Cook's recommendation to Lieutenant. On July 13, 1772 Cook began his second expedition with  HMS Resolution, and Richard Pickersgill joined as the Third Lieutenant.

He did not accompany Cook on his third voyage, but in April 1776 took command of the ship Lyon and was sent to Baffin Bay on the east coast of Canada.

Richard Pickersgill died in 1779 at the age of 30, when he accidentally fell into the Thames when boarding a ship and drowned.

According to Richard Pickersgill, the Pickersgill Islands off South Georgia in the South Atlantic and Pickersgill Harbour, a natural harbour in New Zealand, were named after him.

References

External links
 Journal of Richard Pickersgill, Third Lieutenant of the Resolution

1749 births
1779 deaths
18th-century English people
18th-century explorers
English explorers of the Pacific
Circumnavigators of the globe
English cartographers
English explorers
English sailors
Explorers of New Zealand
People from Hambleton District
Royal Navy officers
Deaths by drowning in the United Kingdom
Military personnel from Yorkshire
James Cook